Persatuan Sepakbola Lombok Barat (simply known as Perslobar) is an Indonesian football club based in West Lombok, West Nusa Tenggara. They currently compete in the Liga 3.

Honours
 Liga 3 West Nusa Tenggara
 Champion: 2021
 Runner-up: 2019

References

External links
 

Sport in West Nusa Tenggara
Football clubs in Indonesia
Football clubs in West Nusa Tenggara